Nallepilly is a village in the Palakkad district, state of Kerala, India. It is the main village of the Nalleppilly gram panchayat and forms a part of Chittur taluk.

History 
Before British Raj, it was part of Kingdom of Cochin.

Demographics
 India census, Nallepilly had a population of 32,044 with 15,566 males and 16,478 females.

References

Nallepilly